Ishenino is a rural locality (a village) in Ilyinskoye Rural Settlement, Kharovsky District, Vologda Oblast, Russia. The population was 16 as of 2002.

Geography 
Ishenino is located 27 km northeast of Kharovsk (the district's administrative centre) by road. Zolotava is the nearest rural locality.

References 

Rural localities in Kharovsky District